Joel Michel Riddez (born 21 May 1980) is a Swedish football coach and former professional player. He was in charge of Swedish Damallsvenskan club Djurgårdens IF between 2017 and 2019. Riddez previously played for Swedish sides Djurgården, Assyriska, and Örebro, as well as Norwegian side Strømsgodset IF. He was capped for the Sweden U17 and U19 teams between 1995 and 1999.

References

External links
  (profile 1)
  (profile 2)

1980 births
Living people
Association football defenders
Swedish footballers
Allsvenskan players
Eliteserien players
Djurgårdens IF Fotboll players
Örebro SK players
Assyriska FF players
Strømsgodset Toppfotball players
Swedish football managers
Djurgårdens IF Fotboll (women) managers
Swedish expatriate footballers
Swedish expatriate sportspeople in Norway
Expatriate footballers in Norway
Footballers from Stockholm
Damallsvenskan managers